DXP may refer to:

 1-deoxy-D-xylulose-5-phosphate synthase (also DXP-synthase), an enzyme
 Deep eXecution Processor, a class of processor made by British multinational fabless semiconductor company Icera
 Domino's DXP, custom third-generation Chevrolet Sparks commissioned by Domino's Pizza
 DXP Productions, the record label that released the debut album by English progressive rock band DeeExpus, Half Way Home
 DXP reductoisomerase, an enzyme